is a railway station in the city of Ena, Gifu Prefecture, Japan, operated by Central Japan Railway Company (JR Central) and by the third-sector railway operator Akechi Railway.

Lines

Layout
The JR portion of the station has one ground-level  side platform and one ground-level island platform connected by a footbridge. The station has a Midori no Madoguchi staffed ticket office. The Akechi Railway portion of the station has a single bay platform serving one track.

Platforms

Adjacent stations

History
The Akechi Line began operations from 24 May 1933. The station was renamed Ena Station from 1 November 1963. On 1 April 1987, it became part of JR Central.

Passenger statistics
In fiscal 2016, the station was used by an average of 3,497 passengers daily (boarding passengers only).

Surrounding area
Ena City Hall
Site of Ōi-juku

Bus routes
Totetsu Bus
For Ena Gorge
For Totetsu Ena Shako (You are able to transfer onto Kita-Ena Kotsu bound to Mino-Sakamoto Station and Nakatsugawa Station at this bus stop)

See also
 List of Railway Stations in Japan

References

External links

  

Railway stations in Japan opened in 1902
Railway stations in Gifu Prefecture
Stations of Central Japan Railway Company
Chūō Main Line
Stations of Akechi Railway
Ena, Gifu